Liam Ball (17 May 1951 – 16 June 1984) was an Irish Olympic swimmer at both the 1968 Mexico City and 1972 Munich Olympic Summer Games, competing for Ireland in the Men's 100 metres Breaststroke and Men's 200 metres Breaststroke at each. He was born in Derry, Northern Ireland and was a past pupil of St. Columb's College in the city.

A local hero, Ball appears in a mural on Creggan's Central Drive. The annual Liam Ball International Triathlon, hosted by the North West Triathlon Club at Templemore Sports Complex in Derry, is also named after Ball.

He died aged 33 at his home in Castlebar after a long illness on 16 June 1984. He had been manager of the local swimming pool.

References

External links

1951 births
1984 deaths
Olympic swimmers of Ireland
Swimmers at the 1968 Summer Olympics
Swimmers at the 1972 Summer Olympics
Male breaststroke swimmers
Sportspeople from Derry (city)
People educated at St Columb's College

Irish male swimmers
20th-century Irish people